The TIA-MC-1 — Телевизионный Игровой Автомат Многокадровый Цветной (pronounced Televizionniy Igrovoi Automat Mnogokadrovyi Tcvetnoi; meaning Video Game Machine – Multiframe Colour) was a Soviet arcade machine with replaceable game programs and was one of the most famous arcade machines from the Soviet Union. The TIA-MC-1 was developed in Vinnytsia, Ukraine by the Ekstrema-Ukraina company in the mid-1980s under the leadership of V.B. Gerasimov. The machine was manufactured by the production association Terminal and some other factories.

Games 

Some of the TIA-MC-1 based games are:
 Автогонки (Avtogonki, Autoracing)
 Биллиард (Billiard, a pool-like game)
 Звёздный рыцарь (Zvezdnyi Rytsar, Star Knight)
 Истребитель (Istrebiteli, Fighter Jet, Harrier)
 Конёк-Горбунок (Konek-Gorbunok, The Humpbacked Horse by Pyotr Pavlovich Yershov)
 Кот-рыболов (Kot-Rybolov, Cat the fisher)
 Котигорошко (Kotigoroshko, title of a Russian fairy tale)
 Остров дракона (Ostrov Drakona, Dragon Island)
 Остров сокровищ (Ostrov Sokrovish, Treasure Island by Robert Louis Stevenson)
 Снежная королева (Snezhnaja koroleva, The Snow Queen by Hans Christian Andersen)
 S.O.S.

The Konek-Gurbunok game is comparable to The Legend of Zelda and included environments such as forests and castles.

Technical specifications 
The arcade machine consists of several boards called BEIA (Russian:БЭИА, Блок Элементов Игрового Автомата, Blok Elementov Igrovogo Automata). 
The boards have the following purposes:
 BEIA-100: data processing; RGB DAC; sound generation; coin-op and game controller interface
 BEIA-101: video sync and background generation
 BEIA-102: sprite generation
 BEIA-103: game ROM and main RAM

Games in a TIA-MC-1 arcade machine can be switched by replacing the BEIA-103 module, not unlike cartridges in video game consoles.

Main system characteristics are as follows:
 CPU: КР580ВМ80А (clone of Intel 8080), 1.78 MHz
 Video resolution: 256×256, 4 bits per pixel selectable from a palette of 256 colors
 Background: two video pages composed of 32×32 tiles, each tile is 8×8 pixels. Tile RAM can store 256 separate tiles.
 Sprites: up to 16 simultaneously displayed hardware-generated sprites; total of 256 sprites can be stored in sprite ROM. Sprites can be vertically and horizontally mirrored in hardware.
 Sound: two  КР580ВИ53 interval timers (Intel 8253) driving a mono speaker.
 Display: 20" (51 cm) TV screen
 Main RAM — 8KiB.
 Character RAM — 8KiB.
 Video RAM — 2KiB.
 Sprite ROM  — 32KiB.
 ROM with game code and background graphics — up to 56KiB.

Emulation 

For a long time the TIA-MC-1 hardware remained unemulated due to a lack of technical information and ROM dumps. Soon after the Russian emulation community obtained technical documentation and ROM dumps of one of the games, Konek-Gorbunok, the first emulator named TIA-MC Emulator was released on July 27, 2006. A TIA-MC-1 driver was included in MAME on August 21, 2006 (since version 0.108). By now, only five games (Konek-Gorbunok, S.O.S., Billiard, Snezhnaja koroleva, Kot-Rybolov) are dumped and supported by emulators. An ongoing search for other games is in progress.

See also 
 Photon (arcade cabinet)
 List of Soviet computer systems

References

External links
 Extreme-Ukraine site, short history of TIA-MC-1 in English, as of October 23, 2007, courtesy of the Wayback Machine.
 The Alternate Universe of Soviet Arcade Games (September 1, 2015. Kristin Winet.)

Arcade system boards
Computing in the Soviet Union
Soviet brands
Goods manufactured in the Soviet Union
Arcade-only video games